Thorpe or Thorp Trophy may refer to:

Ed Thorp Memorial Trophy, trophy awarded to the National Football League (NFL) champions from 1934 through 1967
Jim Thorpe Trophy, NFL most valuable player award from 1955 to 2008
Jim Thorpe Award, college football award for the top defensive back